Sergio Ruiz may refer to:
Sergio Enrique Ruiz-Tlapanco (born 1972), Mexican drug lord
Sergio Ruiz (footballer) (born 1994), Spanish footballer